Raúl Esnal (23 April 1956 – 15 December 1993) was a football defender from Uruguay, who obtained a total number of 4 international caps for the Uruguay national football team. Casado con benigna Fernández hijos Raúl Nicolás Esnal Maria virginia Esnal Christian Eduardo Esnal Carmen Esnal

International career
He was a member of the team that won the 1983 Copa América.

Personal life and death
Esnal is the father of Salvadoran footballer Cristian Esnal.

On December 15, 1993, he was murdered in El Salvador, on the road between Ahuachapán and Acajutla. The murder case has never been solved.

See also
List of unsolved murders

References

External links
 

Bio - Montevideo Wanderers
Raul Snal Bio - CD Atletico Marte 

1956 births
1983 Copa América players
1990s murders in El Salvador
1993 crimes in El Salvador
1993 deaths
1993 murders in North America
A.D. Isidro Metapán footballers
Association football defenders
Aurora F.C. players
C.D. Atlético Marte footballers
Copa América-winning players
Deaths by firearm in El Salvador
Expatriate footballers in Argentina
Expatriate footballers in El Salvador
Male murder victims
Montevideo Wanderers F.C. players
People from Canelones Department
People murdered in El Salvador
Talleres de Córdoba footballers
Unsolved murders in El Salvador
Uruguayan expatriate footballers
Uruguayan footballers
Uruguayan people murdered abroad
Uruguayan Primera División players
Uruguay international footballers